An arenium ion in organic chemistry is a cyclohexadienyl cation that appears as a reactive intermediate in electrophilic aromatic substitution.
For historic reasons this complex is also called a Wheland intermediate, after American chemist George Willard Wheland (1907–1976). They are also called sigma complexes. The smallest arenium ion is the benzenium ion, which is protonated benzene.

Two hydrogen atoms bonded to one carbon lie in a plane perpendicular to the benzene ring. The arenium ion is no longer an aromatic species; however it is relatively stable due to delocalization: the positive charge is delocalized over 3 carbon atoms by the pi system, as depicted on the following resonance structures: 

A complexed electrophile can contribute to the stability of arenium ions. 

Salts of benzenium ion can be isolated when benzene is protonated by the carborane superacid H(CB11H(CH3)5Br6). The benzenium salt is crystalline with thermal stability up to 150 °C. Bond lengths deduced from X-ray crystallography are consistent with a cyclohexadienyl cation structure.

In one study a methylene arenium ion is stabilized by metal complexation:

In this reaction sequence the R–Pd(II)–Br starting complex 1 stabilized by TMEDA is converted through dppe to metal complex 2. Electrophilic attack of methyl triflate forms methylene arenium ion 3 with (based on X-ray crystallography) positive charge located in aromatic para position and with the methylene group 6° out of the plane of the ring. Reaction first with water and then with triethylamine hydrolyzes the ether group.

See also
 Aryl radical
 Cyclopentadienyl anion
 Meisenheimer complex, the analogous intermediate in nucleophilic aromatic substitution
 Tropylium cation

Some historic references

References 

Reactive intermediates
Carbocations